The Troublemaker (Spanish: La revoltosa) is a 1924 Spanish silent film directed by Florián Rey and starring Josefina Tapias, Juan de Orduña and José Moncayo. The film was based on The Troublemaker an 1897 zarzuela by Carlos Fernández Shaw and José López Silva.

Cast
Josefina Tapias as Mari Pepa  
Juan de Orduña as Felipe  
José Moncayo as inspector Candela 
Ceferino Barrajón as Sastre  
Antonio Mata as Zapatero  
Alfredo Hurtado as Golfillo

References

External links

Spanish silent films
Films directed by Florián Rey
Spanish black-and-white films